87 Clockers (stylized as 87CLOCKERS) is a Japanese manga series written and illustrated by Tomoko Ninomiya. It was first serialized in Shueisha's seinen manga magazine Jump X from June 2011 to October 2014, and later in Weekly Young Jump from December 2014 to June 2016.

Publication
Written and illustrated by Tomoko Ninomiya, 87 Clockers was first serialized in Shueisha's seinen manga magazine Jump X from June 25, 2011, to October 10, 2014, when the magazine ceased its publication. The series was transferred to Weekly Young Jump, where it ran from December 25, 2014, to June 30, 2016. Shueisha collected its chapters in nine tankōbon volumes, released from April 10, 2012, to September 16, 2016.

Volume list

References

Further reading

External links
 

Seinen manga
Shueisha manga